Pimpisamai Kansuthi (born 27 November 1977), also known as Jean Kansuthi, is a Thai former professional tennis player. Her daughter Mai and son Tanapatt, both world top-100 juniors, compete on the professional tour.

Kansuthi, a native of Chonburi, was active on tour in the early 1990s. She reached a best singles world ranking of 609 and made a WTA Tour main draw appearance at the 1994 Pattaya Open. A Thai representative at the 1994 Asian Games, she also featured in ties for the Thailand Fed Cup team across 1994 and 1995. She left tennis to further her education but played at collegiate level for Eastern Michigan University and was a two-time MAC Player of the Year.

ITF finals

Singles: 1 (0–1)

Doubles: 1 (1–0)

References

External links
 
 
 

1977 births
Living people
Pimpisamai Kansuthi
Pimpisamai Kansuthi
Eastern Michigan Eagles athletes
College women's tennis players in the United States
Tennis players at the 1994 Asian Games
Pimpisamai Kansuthi